Gladki or Gładki is a surname. Notable people with the surname include:

 Dimitri Gladki (1911–1959), Soviet politician
 Piotr Gładki (1972–2005), Polish long-distance runner

See also
 
 Hladki
 Hladky, Czech and Ukrainian cognate

Polish-language surnames